Simpatico is a 1999 American crime film co-written and directed by Matthew Warchus and starring Nick Nolte, Jeff Bridges, Sharon Stone, Catherine Keener and Albert Finney. It was adapted for the screen from the 1994 play Simpatico by Sam Shepard.

Plot
Three young confidence tricksters— Vinnie, Carter and Rosie — pull off a racing scam, substituting winners for plodders and winning big money on long odds. When an official uncovers the scam, they set him up for blackmail. Twenty years later, Carter and Rosie are married, successful racers in Kentucky about to sell their prize stallion, Simpatico. Vinnie, meanwhile, is a drunk in Pomona. Vinnie decides to make a play for Rosie, lures Carter to California, steals his wallet and heads for Kentucky with the original blackmail material. Carter begs Vinnie's friend, a grocery clerk named Cecilia, to follow Vinnie and recover the material that he has in a box.

Cast
 Nick Nolte as Vinnie Webb
Shawn Hatosy as Young Vinnie Webb
 Jeff Bridges as Lyle Carter
 Sharon Stone as Rosie Carter
Kimberly Williams-Paisley as Young Rosie Carter
 Catherine Keener as Cecilia
 Albert Finney as Simms

Reception
The film received negative reviews from critics. It currently holds a 25% rating on Rotten Tomatoes based on 61 reviews.

References

External links
 
 
 

1999 crime thriller films
1999 films
American crime thriller films
Films set in Kentucky
French films based on plays
English-language French films
French crime thriller films
British films based on plays
British crime thriller films
American films based on plays
Films with screenplays by David Nicholls
Films scored by Stewart Copeland
American neo-noir films
2000 directorial debut films
1990s English-language films
1990s American films
1990s British films
1990s French films
2000s French films